Agave attenuata is a species of flowering plant in the family Asparagaceae, commonly known as the foxtail or lion's tail. The name swan's neck agave refers to its development of a curved inflorescence, unusual among agaves. Native to the plateaux of central west Mexico, as one of the unarmed agaves, it is popular as an ornamental plant in gardens in many other places with subtropical and warm climates.

Description

Although the plant can appear acaulescent, stems often reach 50 to 150 cm (20–60 in) in length, and old leaves fall off, leaving the stems visible. The leaves are ovate-acuminate, 50–70 cm (20–28 in) long and 12–16 cm (5–6 in) wide, pale in color, ranging from a light gray to a light yellowish green. There are no teeth, nor terminal spines, although the leaves taper to soft points that fray with age. The numerous, broad, succulent, tapering leaves are slightly less rigid than most Agave species' leave;, they are a bright glaucous gray to light yellowish-green and stingless.

The inflorescence is a dense raceme 2.5 to 3 meters (8 to 10 ft) high (usually curved), with greenish-yellow flowers, growing after many years. As with other Agave species, the plant dies following seed development, but numerous suckers consequently sprout, both from the base of the plant and from the flower raceme.

It has two subspecies:
A. attenuata subsp. attenuata: Native to Central and Southwest Mexico and naturalized in Madeira and Libya.
A. attenuata subsp. dentata (J.Verschaff.) B.Ullrich: Native to Northwest and Southwest Mexico.

Etymology
The Latin specific epithet attenuata means "with a narrow point".

Range
Specimens were sent to Kew Gardens by the explorer Galeotti in 1834, from an unspecified location in central Mexico. It is reportedly naturalized in Libya and Madeira and is widely spread through the Mediterranean and the rest of Macaronesia.

Cultivation

In cultivation, Agave attenuata is said to prefer relatively moist loamy soil, although it can cope with poor soil and dry conditions. It should be protected from direct sunlight in summer and from long periods of frost. It is hardy down to USDA Zone 9b.

Gallery

References

External links

attenuata
Flora of Central Mexico
Flora of Durango
Flora of Southwestern Mexico
Garden plants of North America
Drought-tolerant plants
Plants described in 1834